Jan Łomnicki (30 June 1929 – 18 December 2002) was a Polish film director and screenwriter. A graduate of the National Film School in Łódź. He directed more than thirty films between 1954 and 2000. His 1976 film To Save the City was awarded at the Polish Film Festival (1976) and was entered into the 10th Moscow International Film Festival (1977).

He was the brother of the actor Tadeusz Łomnicki.

Filmography
 To Save the City (1976) 
 Akcja pod Arsenałem (1978)
 Dom (TV series; 1980–2000)
 Modrzejewska (TV series; 1989)
 Just Beyond This Forest (1991)

References

External links

Jan Łomnicki at the Culture.pl 
 Jan Łomnicki - WIEM Encyclopedia .  Retrieved 2015-02-28.

1929 births
2002 deaths
Polish film directors
People from Pidhaitsi
20th-century Polish screenwriters
Male screenwriters
20th-century Polish male writers